Mark Normand (born September 18, 1983) is an American stand-up comedian and actor. He began performing stand-up in his hometown New Orleans in 2006. He has performed across the United States and abroad and has appeared on Conan, The Tonight Show Starring Jimmy Fallon and The Late Show with Stephen Colbert.

Normand has been a co-host of a weekly podcast called Tuesdays with Stories with fellow comedian Joe List since 2013. He also co-hosts the weekly podcast We Might be Drunk with comedian Sam Morril.

Early life and education
Normand was born in New Orleans, where he attended De La Salle High School. Normand attended the University of New Orleans before taking a year off to study at the New York Film Academy, though he eventually dropped out.

Career
Normand began performing stand-up at Lucy's Retired Surfer Bar in New Orleans in 2006.

Normand regularly performs at comedy clubs and colleges across the country and has performed at numerous festivals, including the Bridgetown Comedy Festival, Seattle International Comedy Competition, Boston Comedy Festival, Melbourne International Comedy Festival and in 2013 was featured as a New Face at Just for Laughs in Montreal.

His half-hour special on Comedy Central's The Half Hour was released in 2014. He also released an album with Comedy Central Records in 2014 titled Still Got It, which was recorded at Comedy on State in Madison, Wisconsin. Normand's hour-long Comedy Central special Don't Be Yourself was released in 2017. He has appeared on Conan six times,  The Tonight Show Starring Jimmy Fallon, The Late Show with Stephen Colbert, The Late Late Show with James Corden, TruTv, Best Week Ever, MTV, Last Comic Standing and @midnight. He has had acting roles in Inside Amy Schumer and Horace and Pete.

Recognition
In 2013, Normand won Carolines on Broadway's March Madness competition, beating out 63 other comedians. He was named The Village Voice "Best Comedian of 2013". In 2012, he appeared on John Oliver's New York Stand-Up Show on Comedy Central, and in 2011 was picked as one of Comedy Central's "Comics to Watch" for the 2011 New York Comedy Festival. Mark was also named Esquire "Best New Comedians 2012", and Time Out New York "21 New York Comedy Scene Linchpins". In 2019, Normand was recognized by comedian Jerry Seinfeld as "the best young up and coming comic that we should keep our eyes on.”

Personal life
Normand lives in the West Village neighborhood of New York City. He has stated that he is an atheist. Normand was in a twelve year relationship with his high-school sweetheart. Normand married Mae Planert in November 2022.

Discography
 Still Got It (2014)
 Don't Be Yourself (2017)
 Out to Lunch (2020)

Filmography

References

1983 births
Living people
21st-century American comedians
American atheists
American male comedians
American podcasters
American stand-up comedians
Comedians from Louisiana
Jewish American atheists
Jewish American male comedians